Limor Friedman (also "Fridman"; לימור פרידמן; born January 30, 1968) is an Israeli former Olympic gymnast. She was born in Israel, and is Jewish.

Gymnastics career
She was coached by Zahava Zissman.  Friedman came in 6th in the South African Cup in November 1982.

Friedman competed for Israel at the 1984 Summer Olympics in Los Angeles, California, at the age of 16 in gymnastics.  In the women's individual all-around she came in 65th, in the women's floor exercise she came in 64th, in the women's horse vault she came in 59th, in the women's uneven bars she came in 64th, and in the women's balance beam she came in 65th. At the time that she competed in the Olympics, she was 5–3.5 (162 cm) tall and weighed 101 lbs (46 kg).

References

External links
 

Gymnasts at the 1984 Summer Olympics
Israeli female artistic gymnasts
Living people
1968 births
Olympic gymnasts of Israel
Jewish gymnasts